Symmetromphalus hageni is a species of sea snail in the family Neomphalidae.

Distribution
Symmetromphalus hageni lives in hot vent sites in the Bismarck Sea.

Description

References

Neomphalidae
Gastropods described in 1992